Special Quartet is an album by the American saxophonist David Murray. It was released on the DIW/Columbia label. It features six quartet performances by Murray with Fred Hopkins, McCoy Tyner, and Elvin Jones. The album was produced by Bob Thiele.

Critical reception 

The Edmonton Journal wrote that "the session ... is not a rehash of Coltrane... Each number works as a blowing vehicle for Murray with a blast furnace at his back."

The AllMusic review by Scott Yanow stated: "A successful outing full of mutual inspiration, this CD is easily recommended."

Track listing 
 "Cousin Mary" (Coltrane)7:30 
 "Hope/Scope"10:48 
 "La Tina Lee" (Morris)6:02 
 "Dexter's Dues"6:33 
 "In A Sentimental Mood" (Ellington, Kurtz, Mills)10:21 
 "3D Family"9:28  
All compositions by David Murray except as indicated
 Recorded March 26, 1990, at Soundtrack, NYC

Personnel 
 David Murraytenor saxophone
 McCoy Tynerpiano
 Fred Hopkinsbass
 Elvin Jonesdrums

References 

David Murray (saxophonist) albums
1991 albums
DIW Records albums
Albums produced by Bob Thiele